The La Brea Stakes is a Grade I American thoroughbred horse race for three-year-old fillies over a distance of seven furlongs on the dirt track held annually in late December at Santa Anita Park in Arcadia, California, USA.  The event currently offers a purse of US$300,000.

History

The event is named for the area in Southern California called La Brea, noted for the La Brea Tar Pits in the middle of the city of Los Angeles.  The word "brea" is Spanish for tar.

The inaugural running of the event was on 16 January 1974 for four-year-old horses over a distance of  miles and was won by Mr. & Mrs Carl Galea's 11/1 longshot Niner Power by a margin of  lengths over First Majesty with Handsome Native  length back in third in a time of 1:43. The event was held in 1975 in January for four-year-olds again with Bobby Murcer winning. However, track management scheduled the event for the 1975–76 Santa Anita Winter meet in December for three-year-old horses and when it came time to the draw entries for the race the event was split into divisions. Hence, for the 1975 calendar year the event was raced three times. In 1976 the event was held on the last day of the year for three-year-olds and the winner Kirby Lane would go on the following year and win the Grade II San Antonio Stakes and the Grade I Charles H. Strub Stakes.

For the next season's winter meeting, Santa Anita scheduled the event in January and that the conditions of the event were for four-year-old fillies at a shorter distance of seven furlongs. Therefore, for the calendar year 1977, the event was not held. The first running as a fillies event the winner was Taisez Vous by an easy 6 lengths.  

The La Brea Stakes was part of Santa Anita Park's La Cañada Series of races open to newly turning/turned 4-year-old fillies and run at an increasing distance. The series begins with the La Brea Stakes at 7 furlongs followed by the Grade II El Encino Stakes at  miles in mid January, then the Grade II La Cañada Stakes at  miles in mid February. Until the series ended in 2011 when the El Encino Stakes was discontinued, only three fillies had ever won all three races: Taisez Vous (1978), Mitterand (1985), and Got Koko (2003). The Santa Anita Park counterpart series for male horses is the Strub Series.

Due to the scheduling near the New Year period, the event was sometimes scheduled in late December as a three-year-old fillies event or in early January as a four-year-old fillies event, such as in 1982, 1985 and 1990 and thus the event would not be held in the calendar year - 1984 and 1986.

American Triple Crown winner Secretariat's daughter Terlingua won this event in 1980. Later as a broodmare her offspring included a champion sire in Storm Cat (1999, 2000). 

In 1983 the American Graded Stakes Committee classified the event as Grade III.

Also American Triple Crown winner Seattle Slew's daughter Savannah Slew won this event in December 1985. Although Savannah Slew retired after this event, Lady's Secret whom she defeated into second place in 1986 had an outstanding year culminating with a victory in the Grade I Breeders' Cup Distaff and winning the U.S. Champion Older Filly award and being voted as United States Horse of the Year.

Prior to winning this event in 1988 Very Subtle had won the Grade I Breeders' Cup Sprint at Hollywood Park. Very Subtle dispatched her opposition by a record winning margin of nine lengths which continues to date to be the largest margin of victory.

In 1991 the event was run in split divisions for the second time and since then has been scheduled only in December.

In 1994 the event was upgraded to Grade II and to the highest classification of Grade I in 1997.

Records
Speed  record:  
7 furlongs: 1:20.33 – Switch (2010)

Margins:
 9 lengths – Very Subtle (1988)

Most wins by a jockey:
 5 – Chris McCarron (1982 (2), 1991, 1995, 1996)
 5 – Gary Stevens (1987, 1990, 1995, 1998, 2013)
 5 – Mike E. Smith (2004, 2007, 2015, 2017, 2019)

Most wins by a trainer:
 9 – Bob Baffert (1992, 1998, 1999, 2005, 2006, 2008, 2012, 2021, 2022)

Most wins by an owner:
 3 – Michael E. Pegram (1992, 1999, 2005)

Winners

Legend:

See also
List of American and Canadian Graded races

External links
 2020 Santa Anita Media Guide

References

Grade 1 stakes races in the United States
Horse races in California
Flat horse races for three-year-old fillies
Sprint category horse races for fillies and mares
Santa Anita Park
Recurring sporting events established in 1974
1974 establishments in California
Graded stakes races in the United States